Mazhavil Manorama is an Indian Malayalam language general entertainment free to air television channel owned by Malayala Manorama Company Limited operated by Malayala Manorama Television (MMTV) the publisher of the widely circulated Malayalam Manorama daily, and the Malayalam women's magazine Vanitha. Mazhavil Manorama is headquartered at Alappuzha in Kerala, India.

History
The channel has been on air since 06:30 pm on 31 October 2011. The Malayala Manorama group was already into TV media through its Malayalam news channel Manorama News.

Mazhavil Manorama began broadcasting in high definition on 14 August 2015 as Mazhavil Manorama HD.

The channel has been airing the Vanitha Film Awards since 2012, and also launched Mazhavil Mango Music Awards in 2018 and the Mazhavil Entertainment Awards in 2019.

The Malayala Manorama Group launched its video-on-demand app Manorama Max that shows entertainment content and movies from the group's general entertainment channel, Mazhavil Manorama, as well as news from Manorama News, in addition to original online-only content. It was launched on 1 September 2019.

Mazhavil manorama has a YouTube handle with more than 10 million subscribers.

Current shows
The following are the prime time shows which are being aired on the channel:

Currently broadcast series

Reality series

Former shows

Original Fiction

 Aayirathil Oruval (2012-2013)
 Aksharathettu (2020)
 Amala (2013-2015)
 Ammuvinte Amma (2017-2018)
 Aniyathi (2014-2015)
Anuragam (2020)
 Athmasakhi (2016-2018)
 Balamani (2014-2015)
 Bhagyadevatha (2013-2014)
 Bhagyajathakam (2018-2020)
 Bhanduvaru Shathruvaru (2015-2016)
 Bhasi & Bhahadoor (2016)
 Bhramanam (2018-2019)
 CBI Diary (2018)
 Chackoyum Maryyum (2019-2020)
 Dr. Ram (2018)
 Dhathuputhri (2015)
 Ennu Swantham Koottukari (2014-2015)
Ente Kuttikalude Achan (2021-2022)
 Ente Pennu (2014-2015)
 Hridayam Sakshi (2012-2013)
 Hridayam Snehasandram (2020-2021)
 Ilayaval Gayathri (2018-2019)
 Indira (2012)
 Ival Yamuna (2013-2014)
 Jeevithanouka (2020-2021)
 Kadhayile Rajakumari (2011-2012)
 Kalyani (2021-2022) 
 Krishnathulasi (2016-2017)
 Malakhamar (2012)
 Makkal (2018)
 Manassu Parayunna Karyangal (2011-2012)
 Manjurukum Kalam (2015-2017)
  Mangalyapattu (2016-2017)
 Malootty (2015-2016)
 Marutheeram thedi (2019)
 Manasaveena (2011-2012)
 Mayamohini (2015)
Meenakshi Kalyanam  (2022-2023)
 Namam Japikunna Veedu (2020-2021)
 Nokketha Doorathu (2017-2018)
 Oru Penninte Kadha (2013-2014)
 Ottachilambu (2016-2017)
 Parinayam (2011-2012)
 Parayan Mohicha Kadhakal (2012)
 Pattu Saree (2012-2014)
 Pranayini (2018)
 Priyapettaval (2019-2020)
 Ponnambili (2015-2016)
 Rakkuyil (2020-2022)
 Ramayanam (2012)
 Sthreepadham (2017-2020)
 Saivinte Makkal (2011-2012)
 Sundari (2015-2016)
 Suryakanthi (2020)
Thumbapoo (2021-2023)
 Vivahitha (2015)

Dubbed Fiction
 Karnan (2017-2018)
 Mahashakthiman Hanuman (2018-2019)

Non-fictional
Reality shows

 Big Salute
 Bhima Jewels Comedy Festival (Season 1 & 2)
 D 4 Dance
 D2 - D 4 Dance
 D3 - D 4 Dance
 D 4 Dance Reloaded
 D 4 Dance Juniors V/S Seniors
 D 5 Junior
 Dhe chef
 Indian Voice (Season 1 & 2)
 Indian Voice Junior
 Komedy Circus
 Kuttikalodano Kali
 Midukki
  Made for Each Other (Season 1,2)
 Minute To Win It
 Nayika Nayakan
 Ningalkkum Aakaam Kodeeshwaran
 Onnum Onnum Moonu (Season 1,2,3,4)
 Paadam Namukku Paadam
 Panam Tharum Padam 
 Super 4 (Season 1-3)
 Uggram Ujjwalam (Season 1 & 2)
 Udan Panam Season 1, 2, 3
 Veruthe Alla Bharya (Season 1-3)

Animated
 Mayavi

Other shows

 Amma Mazhavil / Nakashtrathilakkam / Ammamazhavil Kodiyettam
 Atham Pathu Ruchi
 Chayakkoppayile Kodumkaattu
 Cinemaa Chirimaa
 Dhe Ruchi
 Ee Ganam Marakkumo
 Europil Parannu Parannu
 Kanamarayathu  Kadha Ithuvare Kaliyil Alpam Karyam Kusruthi Kudumbam Idavelayil Mittayi.com Orikkal Koodi Ithu Nalla Thamasha Ividingananu bhai Hello namaste Mazhavil Ruchi Prekshakare Avashyamunde Ruchi Vismayam Take it easy Thakarppan Comedy 1,2 Thakarppan Comedy Mahamela ChirimazhaSnehathode Veetil Ninnnu Still Standing Vanitha First Print Innathe Cinema Puthu Chithrangal Tharathinoppam''

Mazhavil Manorama HD

Mazhavil Manorama is the second regional Malayalam channel launched in high definition, along with Asianet HD (13 August 2015) owned by Disney Star. Mazhavil Manorama HD has been aired since 14 August 2015 as Mazhavil Manorama HD.

Channels & OTT Platform

References

External links
 Official site

Malayalam-language television channels
Television channels and stations established in 2011
Malayala Manorama group
Television stations in Thiruvananthapuram
2011 establishments in Kerala